Rodolfo Espinoza Díaz (born 14 June 1981) is a Mexican former professional footballer who played as a midfielder.

Honours
Mexico U23
CONCACAF Olympic Qualifying Championship: 2004

Universitario de Deportes
Torneo Descentralizado: 2009

References

External links

1981 births
Living people
Footballers from Sinaloa
People from Guasave
Association football midfielders
Mexican footballers
Club Necaxa footballers
Atlante F.C. footballers
Chiapas F.C. footballers
Club Universitario de Deportes footballers
Chivas USA players
Sporting Cristal footballers
Correcaminos UAT footballers
Mexican expatriate footballers
Expatriate footballers in Peru
Expatriate soccer players in the United States
Mexican expatriate sportspeople in Peru
Mexican expatriate sportspeople in the United States
Major League Soccer players